The branched chain amino acid:cation symporter (LIVCS) family (TC# 2.A.26) is a member of the APC superfamily. Characterized members of this family transport all three of the branched chain aliphatic amino acids (leucine (L), isoleucine (I) and valine (V)). These proteins are found in Gram-negative and Gram-positive bacteria and function by a Na+ or H+ symport mechanism. They possess about 440 amino acyl residues and display 12 putative transmembrane helical spanners. As of early 2016, no crystal structures for members of the LIVCS family are available on RCSB.

Transport reaction
The generalized transport reaction is:

[L, I or V] (out) + [Na+ or H+] (out) → [L, I or V] (in) + [Na+ or H+] (in).

Proteins
As of early 2016, there are 10 known proteins in the LIVCS family. These can be found in the Transporter Classification Database.

References

Further reading
 Braun, Peter R.; Al-Younes, Hesham; Gussmann, Joscha; Klein, Jeannette; Schneider, Erwin; Meyer, Thomas F. (2008-03-01). "Competitive inhibition of amino acid uptake suppresses chlamydial growth: involvement of the chlamydial amino acid transporter BrnQ". Journal of Bacteriology 190 (5): 1822–1830. . . . .
 Böhmer, Christine; Rauhut, Oliver W. M.; Wörheide, Gert (2015-07-07). "Correlation between Hox code and vertebral morphology in archosaurs". Proceedings of the Royal Society B: Biological Sciences 282 (1810). . . . .
 Trip, Hein; Mulder, Niels L.; Lolkema, Juke S. (2013-01-01). "Cloning, expression, and functional characterization of secondary amino acid transporters of Lactococcus lactis". Journal of Bacteriology 195 (2): 340–350. . . . .
 Reizer, J; Reizer, A; Saier, MH Jr. (June 29, 1994). "A functional superfamily of sodium/solute symporters.". 1197(2): (2): 133–66. .

Protein families
Transmembrane transporters
Protein pages needing a picture